Akrotiri (Greek: Ακρωτήρι, pronounced ) means "cape, promontory". As a result, many different seaside places bear this name. Akrotiri may refer to:

Places

Cyprus
 Akrotiri and Dhekelia, a British Overseas Territory
 Akrotiri (village), a village in the Akrotiri Peninsula
 Akrotiri Bay, a bay in the south
 Akrotiri Peninsula (Cyprus), a peninsula bounded by Akrotiri Bay and Episkopi Bay
 RAF Akrotiri, a British Royal Air Force base

Greece
 Akrotiri, Crete, a peninsula and a municipality on the island of Crete
 Akrotiri (prehistoric city), a Minoan settlement on the island of Santorini (Thera)
 Akrotiri, Santorini, a modern village near the Minoan settlement above
 Castle of Akrotiri, a former Venetian castle in the Santorini village above

See also
 Akrotiri Salt Lake, a popular wintering place for flamingos in the Akrotiri Peninsula in Cyprus
 Akrotiri Boxer Fresco, a Bronze Age painting in the Greek prehistoric city above